NTV Akawungeezi is NTV Uganda's daily news programme, which is delivered in the Luganda language.

Details
Akawungeezi is one of the most watched television programmes in Uganda.  It is aired daily, with news anchors who include Faridah Nakazibwe, Frank Walusimbi, and Patrick Mukasa; and news reporters including Solomon Kaweesa and Joyce Bagala.

Ratings
According to GeoPoll, the top three Luganda TV new programs that aired during the 7 – 8 p.m. timeslot were NTV Uganda's Akawungeezi(18% share); Bukedde 1’s Agabutikidde(15% share); and NBS Television's Amasengejje(11%)

References

 Ugandan television shows